is a sub-temple of Daitoku-ji, Kyoto, Japan. It was founded in 1566 as the mortuary temple of Miyoshi Nagayoshi. In 1589 Sen no Rikyū designated it as the mortuary temple for his family. The Hondō (1583) and chashitsu (1739) are Important Cultural Properties and the gardens have been designated a Place of Scenic Beauty. A painting of Miyoshi Nagayoshi (1566) has also been designated an Important Cultural Property. The temple also contains a great number of fusuma paintings done by Kanō Eitoku.

See also
Daitoku-ji
Japanese gardens
Japanese painting
List of Special Places of Scenic Beauty, Special Historic Sites and Special Natural Monuments
List of National Treasures of Japan (paintings)

References

Further reading

Buddhist temples in Kyoto
Daitoku-ji temples
Daitoku-ji
Places of Scenic Beauty
Important Cultural Properties of Japan